Lou Wie-ki (born 26 May 1965) is a Taiwanese wrestler. He competed in the men's freestyle 52 kg at the 1984 Summer Olympics.

References

1965 births
Living people
Taiwanese male sport wrestlers
Olympic wrestlers of Taiwan
Wrestlers at the 1984 Summer Olympics
Place of birth missing (living people)